The Aztec Student Union is a student union in the center of San Diego State University's campus, just east of Malcolm A. Love Library.  The Aztec Student Union was known as the Aztec Center from 1968 to 2011, when it was demolished for the Aztec Student Union. The Aztec Student Union leads into the heart of the SDSU campus and is located near many classrooms and administrative services.

Aztec Center 

The Aztec Center offered a variety of services, places, and spaces geared to the needs of students including restaurants, movie theater, meeting rooms, and various student organizations. It was also home to the Associated Students' Government & Business Office, Council Chambers, the Government Affairs Office and Meeting Services. Many student organizations also housed their offices in the Aztec Center.

History 
The Aztec Center, planned in the late 1950s and built in the early 1960s, was the first permanent student union in the California State University system.

See also 
 Student activity center

References

External links 
 Associated Students of SDSU — Aztec Student Union homepage
 Aztec Shops
 Plan for Expansion of Aztec Center and SDSU student union spaces

San Diego State University
Student activity centers in the United States
Buildings and structures in San Diego